Galloway and West Dumfries is a constituency of the Scottish Parliament (Holyrood) covering part of the council area of Dumfries and Galloway. It elects one Member of the Scottish Parliament (MSP) by the plurality (first past the post) method of election. It is also one of nine constituencies in the South Scotland electoral region, which elects seven additional members, in addition to the nine constituency MSPs, to produce a form of proportional representation for the region as a whole.

Created for the 2011 Scottish Parliament election, it comprises areas that were previously part of the old Dumfries and Galloway and Upper Nithsdale constituencies, which were abolished.

The seat has been held by Finlay Carson of the Conservatives since the 2016 Scottish Parliament election.

Electoral region 

The other eight constituencies of the South Scotland region are Ayr, Carrick, Cumnock and Doon Valley, Clydesdale, Dumfriesshire, East Lothian, Ettrick, Roxburgh and Berwickshire, Kilmarnock and Irvine Valley and Midlothian South, Tweeddale and Lauderdale.

The region covers the Dumfries and Galloway council area, part of the East Ayrshire council area, part of the East Lothian council area, part of the Midlothian council area, the Scottish Borders council area, the South Ayrshire council area and part of the South Lanarkshire council area.

Constituency boundaries and council area 

Dumfries and Galloway is represented in the Scottish Parliament by two constituencies: Dumfriesshire and Galloway and West Dumfries. Galloway and West Dumfries covers the western part of the council area. The town of Dumfries is divided between the two constituencies.

The electoral wards forming the Galloway and West Dumfries constituency are listed below. All of these wards are part of Dumfries and Galloway:

Stranraer and the Rhins
Mid Galloway and Wigtown West
Dee and Glenkens
Castle Douglas and Crocketford
Abbey
North West Dumfries

Constituency profile and voting patterns

Constituency profile 
The Galloway and West Dumfries constituency covers a large, diverse stretch of land between the Rhins of Galloway in the extreme south-west of Scotland and the River Nith and Cluden Water in eastern Dumfries and Galloway. It covers a set of rugged pastoral plains and forests across the region of Galloway, taking in rural towns such as Castle Douglas, Newton Stewart, Kirkcudbright and St John's Town of Dalry. To the west of the constituency is the portly town of Stranraer, situated at the base of Loch Ryan, whilst in the east the constituency takes in patches of Dumfries, administrative centre of the Dumfries and Galloway Council area.

Voting patterns 
Galloway and West Dumfries has a dynamic mix of political traditions. It covers most of the former Galloway and Upper Nithsdale constituency, a seat which has a long-standing tradition of being marginally contested between the Conservatives and the Scottish National Party, in addition to patches of the former safe Labour constituency of Dumfries. This dynamic was represented within local council politics with Wigtownshire traditionally voting SNP, Kirkcudbrightshire voting Conservative and Dumfries voting Labour.

At Westminster the Galloway and Upper Nithsdale constituency was represented by Conservative Ian Lang from its creation at the 1983 UK general election until 1997. It became the only Conservative constituency in the UK Parliament in Scotland in 2001. The Conservatives have represented the area in the Scottish Parliament since 2003.

In the 2022 council election, 5 out of 6 wards in Galloway and West Dumfries voted Conservative - with Galloway wards voting Conservative and North West Dumfries voting SNP.

Member of the Scottish Parliament

Election results

2020s

2010s

References

External links

Politics of Dumfries and Galloway
Scottish Parliament constituencies and regions from 2011
Constituencies of the Scottish Parliament
Constituencies established in 2011
2011 establishments in Scotland
Dumfries
Stranraer
Dalbeattie
Castle Douglas
Newton Stewart
Wigtownshire
Whithorn
Kirkcudbrightshire